Fidelio Telemetry is a computer software company, located in Italy, to develop telemetry software for R/C Racing Car. Its products include "Fidelio Orchestra" and "Testbed".
Fidelio Telemetry develops telemetry software for processing and plotting telemetry data for R/C Car vehicles and RC racing setup.

History
Fidelio Telemetry was founded in 2013, and has been providing telemetry software. In 2015, Fidelio Telemetry claimed to have over 3000 customers.

Products

Telemetry in R/C Racing Car
The rise of radio controller with telemetry support in RC Car world joint the opportunities offered by computer calculation are bringing new challenges to maintaining effective tools and analyzing programs for critical data and situations.
The telemetry system in R/C world are introduced since 2010. The radio transmitter for R/C of last generation equipped with telemetry system can be store an enormous amount of data. 
The Fidelio software are able to display, processing and analyze information from the following sensors:
 Engine RPM
 Temperature
 Voltage
 Throttle
 Brake
 Steering

The calculation modules offers the capability to evaluate variables such as:
Top speed
Dynamic response of the car (weight transfer study)
Ideal racing line

Optimal Racing Line & Camera Car support

In motorsport, the racing line or simply "the line" is the path taken by a driver through a corner or series of corners with the typical goal of minimizing lap times.
The software supports:  
Camera Car monitor (linked to telemetry informations)
A computation of optimal racing line for the track drawn.

See also
 Racing line
 Radio control
 Weight transfer
 List of 2.4 GHz radio use

References

External links
 Fidelio Telemetry Official Website

Radio-controlled cars